The Florida College System, previously the Florida Community College System, is a system of 28 public community colleges and state colleges in the U.S. state of Florida. In 2013-14, enrollment consisted of more than 813,000 students. Together with the State University System of Florida, which consists of Florida's twelve public universities, the two systems control all public higher education in the state of Florida.

While governed by local boards of trustees, the colleges are coordinated under the jurisdiction of Florida's State Board of Education. Administratively, the chancellor of the Florida College System is the chief executive officer of the system, reporting to the commissioner of Education who serves as the chief executive officer of Florida's public education system. In 2009, the Florida Legislature changed the name from the "Florida Community College System" to the "Florida College System," reflecting the fact that some of its member institutions now offer four-year bachelor's degrees.  Only two schools in the Florida College System still have the word "community" in their official name: Hillsborough Community College and Tallahassee Community College.

Member institutions

Student profile

Mission and offerings
Section (s.) 1004.65, Florida Statutes (F.S.), establishes the primary mission and responsibility of Florida College System institutions as responding to community needs for post secondary academic education and career degree education. This mission and responsibility includes: 
(a) Providing lower level undergraduate instruction and awarding associate degrees. 
(b) Preparing students directly for careers requiring less than baccalaureate degrees. This may include preparing for job entry, supplementing of skills and knowledge, and responding to needs in new areas of technology. Career education in a Florida College System institution shall consist of career certificates, credit courses leading to associate in science degrees and associate in applied science degrees, and other programs in fields requiring substantial academic work, background, or qualifications. A Florida College System institution may offer career education programs in fields having lesser academic or technical requirements. 
(c) Providing student development services, including assessment, student tracking, support for disabled students, advisement, counseling, financial aid, career development, and remedial and tutorial services, to ensure student success. 
(d) Promoting economic development for the state within each Florida College System institution district through the provision of special programs, including, but not limited to:
1. Enterprise Florida-related programs.   
2. Technology transfer centers.   
3. Economic development centers.   
4. Workforce literacy programs. 
(e) Providing dual enrollment instruction. 
(f) Providing upper level instruction and awarding baccalaureate degrees as specifically authorized by law.

A separate and secondary role for Florida College System institutions includes the offering of programs in: 
(a) Community services that are not directly related to academic or  occupational advancement.  
(b) Adult education services, including adult basic education, adult  general education, adult secondary education, and General Educational Development test instruction.  
(c) Recreational and leisure services.

In addition, s. 1007.33(2), F.S., requires that any Florida College System institution that offers one or more baccalaureate degree programs: 
(a) Maintain as its primary mission: 
1. Responsibility for responding to community needs for post secondary academic education and career degree education as prescribed in s. 1004.65(5), F.S.
2. The provision of associate degrees that provide access to a university. 
(b) Maintain an open-door admission policy for associate-level degree  programs and workforce education programs. 
(c) Continue to provide outreach to underserved populations. 
(d) Continue to provide remedial education. 
(e) Comply with all provisions of the statewide articulation agreement which relate to 2-year and 4-year public degree-granting institutions as adopted by the State Board of Education pursuant to s. 1007.23, F.S.

In 2023, the presidents of the system’s member institutions issued a joint statement against Diversity, equity, and inclusion initiatives and stated that they “will not fund or support any institutional practice, policy, or academic requirement that compels belief in critical race theory or related concepts such as intersectionality”.

Athletics 
The schools athletic teams are governed by the Florida State College Activities Association (FSCAA) and compete in the National Junior College Athletic Association Region 8.

Chancellors and directors

Timeline
James L. Wattenbarger, distinguished service professor emeritus, University of Florida
and Harry T. Albertson, former chief executive officer, Florida Association of Community Colleges, outlined the history of the Florida College System through 2009.

See also

Education in Florida
Florida Board of Governors
Florida Department of Education
State University System of Florida
List of colleges and universities in Florida

References

External links

 
State agencies of Florida
1933 establishments in Florida
Public university systems in the United States